The Kokusai Ki-76, or Liaison Aircraft Type 3 (in ), was a Japanese high-wing monoplane artillery spotter and liaison aircraft that served in World War II. The Allied reporting name was "Stella".

Design and development
In 1940, the Imperial Japanese Army Air Force ordered the Nippon Kokusai Koku Kogyo to produce an artillery spotting and liaison aircraft. The resulting Ki-76 was inspired by, and similar to, the German Fieseler Fi 156 "Storch", although not a direct copy. Like the Storch, it was a high-winged monoplane with a fixed tailwheel undercarriage. However, rather than the slotted flaps used by the German aircraft, the Ki-76 used Fowler flaps, while it was powered by Hitachi Ha-42 radial engine rather than the Argus As 10 inline engine of the Storch.

First flying in May 1941, the Ki-76 proved successful when evaluated against an example of the Fi-156, and was ordered into production as the Army Type 3 Command Liaison Plane in November 1942.

Operational history

The Ki-76 remained in service as an artillery spotter and liaison aircraft until the end of the war. Ki-76s were also used as anti-submarine aircraft, operating from the Japanese Army's escort carrier, the Akitsu Maru, being fitted with an arrestor hook and carrying two 60 kg (132 lb) depth charges.

Operators

 Imperial Japanese Army Air Service

 Royal Thai Air Force

Specifications (Ki-76)

See also

References

  (new edition 1987 by Putnam Aeronautical Books, .)
 Jackson, Robert, The Encyclopedia of Military Aircraft, Parragon, 2002. .

Ki-76
1940s Japanese military reconnaissance aircraft
Single-engined tractor aircraft
High-wing aircraft
Aircraft first flown in 1941